Adrian Geiges (born 3 September 1960) is a German writer and journalist born in Basel, Switzerland.

Life 

Adrian Geiges, born September 3, 1960,  is a journalist from the Black Forest in southern Germany. He became the CEO of the Chinese subsidiary of the German publisher Bertelsmann. In his autobiography, “How the World Revolution Once Accidentally Started in the Black Forest“, he describes how he transformed from a West German communist to a capitalist, ironically in the People’s Republic of China. He had a year-long training at a secret cadre school in former communist East Germany.

His autobiography describes moral conflicts, typical of the many in his country of his generation who started as extreme leftists and evolved at breakneck speed into aggressive capitalists. These developments in Geiges’ political and work commitments led to far-reaching changes in his personal life, including in his love and sex life.

In German media his book has been seen as a biography of a lost generation that dreamed of a better future without noticing the present. The leading German newspaper Sueddeutsche Zeitung calls it a book "that sometimes lets you roar with laughter and sometimes makes you sad."

Since the summer of 2004 Adrian Geiges has been the Beijing Correspondent of the leading German weekly news magazine Stern. Before that he founded the Chinese enterprise of G+J, the Bertelsmann corporation’s magazine division. In the 1990s he had worked as a television reporter for Spiegel TV and RTL in Moscow and New York. He has studied Chinese and Russian.

In early 2013 he moved to Rio de Janeiro (Brazil) and has been working there as a documentary filmmaker. He is living in a favela and has written about his experiences in Brazil in his book "Brazil is Burning".

Works 

 Brazil is Burning, Quadriga 2014
 With Confucius to World Power, with Stefan Aust, Quadriga 2012
 How the World Revolution Once Accidentally Started in the Black Forest. Eichborn 2007
 Russia Explosive (together with Andre Zalbertus). vgs 1994
 Love is Not on the State Plan (together with Tatjana Suworowa), Japanese Edition. JICC 1992
 Love is Not on the State Plan (together with Tatjana Suworowa ), Russian Edition. Sobesednik 1990
 Revolution Without Shooting, Turkish Edition, Iletisim Yayinlari, 1990
 Love is Not on the State Plan (together with Tatjana Suworowa). Wolfgang    Krüger/S.Fischer 1989
 Revolution Without Shooting. Pahl-Rugenstein 1988
 Awakening China. Pahl-Rugenstein 1987
 "Xi Jinping. Der mächtigste Mann der Welt". Piper, München-Berlin, 2021.

References

External links 
Adrian Geiges' Official Website
 
 

Living people
1960 births
German male writers